Wedding TV Asia was a woman's lifestyle television channel broadcast in the United Kingdom, on the Sky platform. It launched on 1 July 2009, replacing Wedding TV +1. Wedding TV Asia was the first channel in the UK to be dedicated to Asian weddings.

On 6 December 2010, Wedding TV Asia was removed from Freesat channel 401. The channel ceased broadcasting completely on 14 December.

References

Television channels and stations established in 2009
Television channels in the United Kingdom
Wedding television shows
South Asian culture
Television channels and stations disestablished in 2010
Defunct television channels in the United Kingdom